The O'Jays are an American R&B group from Canton, Ohio, formed in 1958 and originally consisting of Eddie Levert, Walter Lee Williams, William Powell, Bobby Massey, and Bill Isles.  The O'Jays made their first chart appearance with the minor hit "Lonely Drifter" in 1963, but reached their greatest level of success once Gamble & Huff, a team of producers and songwriters, signed them to their Philadelphia International label in 1972. With Gamble & Huff, the O'Jays (now a trio after the departure of Isles and Massey) emerged at the forefront of Philadelphia soul with "Back Stabbers" (1972), and topped the US Billboard Hot 100 the following year with "Love Train". Several other US R&B hits followed, and the O'Jays were inducted into the Vocal Group Hall of Fame in 2004, The Rock and Roll Hall of Fame in 2005, and the Rhythm and Blues Music Hall of Fame in 2013.

Career

The group was formed in Canton, Ohio, in 1958 while its members were attending Canton McKinley High School. Originally known as The Mascots, and then The Triumphs, the friends began recording with "Miracles" in 1961, which was a moderate hit in the Cleveland area. In 1963, they took the name 'The O'Jays', in tribute to Cleveland radio disc jockey Eddie O'Jay, who was part of the powerful management team of Frankie Crocker, Herb Hamlett and O'Jay. In 1963, the O'Jays released "Lonely Drifter", their first national chart hit on the  Billboard Hot 100, peaking at number 93. Their debut album, released shortly thereafter was Comin' Through.

In the early 1960s, member Frank "Frankie" Little, Jr. joined the group as a guitarist and songwriter. He worked with lead vocalist Eddie Levert, assisting with some of the writing for the group, including 1964’s “Do the Jerk,” 1966’s “Pretty Words,” and 1967’s “Oh, How You Hurt Me”. He is also credited with vocals on 1962’s “Down at the Corner”. According to Walter Williams, “Frankie was a guitarist and songwriter in the very early O’Jays. He came with us when we first ventured out of Cleveland and traveled to Los Angeles, but he also was in love with a woman in Cleveland that he missed so much that he soon returned back to Cleveland after a short amount of time."  In 2021, human remains discovered in 1982 at Twinsburg, Ohio, were identified as those of Frankie Little.

Throughout the 1960s, the group continued to chart with minor hits such as "Lipstick Traces" (which they performed nationally on the ABC television program Shivaree), "Stand In for Love", "Stand Tall", "Let It All Out", "I'll Be Sweeter Tomorrow", "Look Over Your Shoulder", "Deeper in Love with You", and "One Night Affair". However, while they issued dozens of singles throughout the decade, they never hit the US top 40 (although "Lipstick Traces" made it to number 19 in Canada). On the R&B chart, the O'Jays were somewhat more prominent, but their only top 10 R&B single prior to 1972 was 1968's "I'll Be Sweeter Tomorrow".

In spite of their success as a touring group and on the R&B chart, the group had been considering quitting the music industry in 1972. Around that time, original members Bill Isles and Bobby Massey departed, leaving the group a trio. The remaining three original members, Eddie Levert, William Powell, and Walter Williams continued recording together, and Gamble & Huff, a team of producers and songwriters with whom the O'Jays had been working for several years, signed them to their Philadelphia International label. Suddenly, the O'Jays released their first million-seller, "Back Stabbers", from the album of the same name. This album produced several more hit singles, including "992 Arguments", "Sunshine", "Time to Get Down", and the number 1 pop smash, "Love Train".

During the remainder of the 1970s, the O'Jays continued releasing hit singles, including "Put Your Hands Together" (Pop number 10), "For the Love of Money" (Pop number 9), "Give the People What They Want", "Let Me Make Love to You", "I Love Music" (Pop number 5), "Livin' for the Weekend", "Message in Our Music", and "Darlin' Darlin' Baby (Sweet Tender Love)". Original member William Powell died of cancer in 1977 at age 35.

After adding Sammy Strain (of Little Anthony and the Imperials), the O'Jays continued recording, though with limited success. In 1978, the group released "Use ta Be My Girl", which was their final top-five hit, though they continued placing songs on the R&B charts throughout the 1980s. The O'Jays' success was not confined to the United States, as they also logged nine hit singles in the United Kingdom between 1972 and 1983, including four tracks that reached the top 20 on the UK Singles Chart. Their 1987 album, Let Me Touch You, was a breakthrough of sorts, and included the number 1 R&B hit "Lovin' You". Though they continued charting on the R&B charts in the late 1980s and early 1990s, the O'Jays never again achieved pop success. In 1992, Sammy Strain left the group and returned to the Imperials. Strain's departure was filled by Nathaniel Best (born December 13, 1960), who was later replaced by Eric Grant. Later in the 1990s, the group did little recording, though they remained a popular live draw. Their latest album was Imagination, released in 2004.

In 2003, the trio co-starred in the film The Fighting Temptations, which starred Cuba Gooding Jr. and Beyoncé Knowles. In the film, they played three barbers with incredible vocal harmony who joined the local church choir to help out the film's protagonists: Darrin (Gooding) and Lilly (Knowles), who were the choir director and lead singer, respectively.

In 2005, the O'Jays were inducted into the Rock and Roll Hall of Fame. Original members Eddie Levert, Walter Williams, Bobby Massey and, posthumously, William Powell, were inducted. In a note of controversy, Sammy Strain was also inducted with the group, while original member Bill Isles was not. (Strain is one of the few artists in popular music history who is a double RRHOF inductee: with the O'Jays in 2005, and Little Anthony and the Imperials in 2009). In 2006, the O'Jays performed at the ESPY awards, hosted by Lance Armstrong. "For the Love of Money" was the theme song to the hit reality TV show The Apprentice, starring Donald Trump, and the group once performed the song live on the show.

On February 23, 2007, Radio-Canada's website reported that Canadian Industry Minister Jim Prentice had used the song "For the Love of Money" without the group's permission during a political event, a faux pas since Prentice is responsible for the application of the Copyright Act in Canada. Radio-Canada also reported that Prentice has since been contacted by the attorneys for both the O'Jays and Warner/Chappell Music.

On June 28, 2009, at the 2009 BET Award Show in the Shrine Auditorium, the O'Jays were honored with BET's 2009 Life Time Achievement Award. Tevin Campbell, Trey Songz, Tyrese Gibson and Johnny Gill performed a medley of the group's songs, followed by the presentation of the award by Don Cornelius. The group reminisced, joked with the audience, and accepted their award before performing renditions of their hit songs.

On October 30, 2010, the group performed at Jon Stewart and Stephen Colbert's Rally to Restore Sanity and/or Fear in Washington, D.C. In Cleveland, Ohio, on August 17, 2013, the O'Jays were inducted into the National Rhythm & Blues Hall of Fame The O'Jays are also two-time Grammy Hall of Fame Inductees for their songs "Love Train" (inducted 2006) and "For the Love of Money" (inducted 2016).

Bill Isles (born William Carvan Isles II in McAdenville, North Carolina) died on March 25, 2019, at the age of 78.

Original members
 Eddie Levert (born June 16, 1942)
 Walter Lee Williams (born  August 25, 1943)
 William Powell (January 20, 1942 – May 26, 1977)
 Bobby Massey (born 1942) 
 Bill Isles (January 4, 1941  – March 25, 2019).

Discography

Top twenty albums
The following albums reached the top twenty on the United States Billboard 200 pop albums chart.
1972: Back Stabbers (US number 10)
1973: Ship Ahoy (US number 11)
1974: The O'Jays Live in London (US number 17)
1975: Survival (US number 11)
1975: Family Reunion (US number 7)
1976: Message in the Music (US number 20)
1978: So Full of Love (US number 6)
1979: Identify Yourself (US number 16)

Top twenty singles
The following singles reached the top twenty on either the United States Billboard Hot 100 or the United Kingdom's UK Singles Chart.
1972: "Back Stabbers" (US number 3; UK number 14; Canada number 39)
1973: "Love Train" (US number 1; UK number 9; Canada number 15)
1973: "Put Your Hands Together" (US number 10)
1974: "For the Love of Money" (US number 9)
1975: "I Love Music" (US number 5; UK number 13)
1976: "Livin' For The Weekend" (US number 20)
1978: "Use ta Be My Girl" (US number 4; UK number 12)

DVDs
The O'Jays Live in Concert (2010)

Gold and platinum records
Gold discs, signifying sales in excess of five hundred thousand copies (USA), were awarded by the RIAA for their singles "Back Stabbers", "Love Train", "For the Love of Money", "I Love Music", and "Use ta Be My Girl"; plus for the albums Back Stabbers, Ship Ahoy, The O'Jays Live in London, Survival, Travelin' at the Speed of Thought, Message in the Music, Emotionally Yours,  and Family Reunion. "For the Love of Money" was used as the theme for the two reality shows The Apprentice and The Celebrity Apprentice on NBC-TV.

The following albums by the O'Jays have received RIAA platinum status indicating sales in excess of one million copies: Ship Ahoy, Family Reunion, Identify Yourself, and So Full of Love.

Other awards
 Black Entertainment Television Lifetime Achievement Award (awarded 2009) 
 SoulTracks Lifetime Achievement Award (awarded 2019)
 National Rhythm & Blues Hall of Fame (inducted 2013) 
 Trumpet Award (awarded 2011) 
 Rock and Roll Hall of Fame (inducted 2005) 
 Vocal Group Hall of Fame (inducted 2004) 
 Grammy Hall of Fame (two-time inductees) for songs "Love Train" (inducted 2006) and "For The Love Of Money" (inducted 2016)
 Rhythm and Blues Music Hall of Fame (inducted 2013) 
  Numerous RIAA Gold and Platinum Awards (see above)
 Soul Train Music Award for Quincy Jones Award for Career Achievement (awarded 2002)
 National Rhythm & Blues Foundation Pioneer Award (awarded 1998) 
 NAACP Image Award - Hall of Fame Award (awarded 1992) 
 American Music Award (awarded 1990)

See also

List of number-one hits (United States)
List of artists who reached number one on the Hot 100 (U.S.)
List of number-one dance hits (United States)
List of artists who reached number one on the U.S. Dance chart

References

External links

Detailed biography of Sammy Strain in PDF format
 "Lawsuit comes between members of O'Jays: Sammy Strain says Eddie and Walter "conspired" to rob him of royalties." Accessed 3-14-08.

1958 establishments in Ohio
American funk musical groups
American soul musical groups
African-American musical groups
Bell Records artists
Imperial Records artists
Musical groups established in 1958
Musical groups from Ohio
Musicians from Canton, Ohio
Philadelphia International Records artists